Rochester Telephone Corporation was a company that provided local telephone service to Rochester, New York. The company was founded in 1920 as a merger of Rochester Telephonic Exchange and Rochester Telephone Company. In 1995 the company became Frontier Corporation, trading on the NYSE under the FRO symbol.  Ownership passed to Global Crossing in 1999, and then, in 2001, to Citizens Utilities Corporation, which later changed its name to Frontier Communications.

Rochester Telephone Corporation was the thirteenth largest diversified American telecommunications company and the largest telephone company in New York. It provided local telephone service to customers in 14 states and operated subsidiaries in a number of related fields. The company was founded in the fledgling days of the telephone industry as an independent telephone operation, not affiliated with the nationwide Bell network. After suffering the effects of poor management in the middle years of the century, Rochester Telephone recovered and grew rapidly in the 1960s and 1970s. This strong progress allowed the company to successfully diversify in the 1980s.

History
Principal Subsidiaries: RCI Long Distance; Rotelcom, Inc.; Rochester Tel Mobile Communications; Rochester Tel Cellular Holding Corporation.

Rochester Telephonic Exchange and Rochester Telephone Company (1877-1920)
Rochester Telephone got its start late in the nineteenth century. Alexander Graham Bell invented the telephone in 1875, and the following year he patented it and exhibited his device to great acclaim at the Philadelphia Centennial Exhibition. By July 1877, the telephone had made its way to Rochester, New York, where a line was strung between the offices of the Phillips Coal Company and its coal yards a mile and a half away. Following this precedent, in 1879, Rochester established two telephone companies, one a franchise of the American Bell Telephone Company, and one a part of the Edison company. The Bell affiliate, called the Rochester Telephonic Exchange, was a branch of the Bell Company of Buffalo.

The two telephone companies competed for less than 18 months before merging under the aegis of the Bell system. In 1880 the company had 50 phone lines, which it provided to residential customers at the rate of $24 a year; businesses paid more for the service. Within six years the number of telephone users in the city had increased exponentially, reaching 1,000. All lines were party lines, and there were no telephone numbers; calls were placed through a switchboard manned by operators, who connected parties by name. Calls passed over lines strung along streets on poles with crossbars, which observers complained were unsightly.

In 1886 the Bell Company announced that customers would no longer be charged a flat fee, but would be charged by call for all telephone use over 500 calls a year. Outraged customers objected, and the Rochester city council revoked the company's franchise. In addition, telephone users staged a strike, removing their receivers at noon on November 20, 1886, and leaving them off the hook for 18 months while the company stood fast. Finally, Bell gave way, offering lower rates, and the strike was ended.

The telephone strike had stimulated in Rochester's citizens a desire for a locally owned telephone company. When the Bell Company's patents expired in 1893, many competing telephone enterprises sprung up. In early 1899, a group of Rochester businessmen joined this movement when they founded the Home Telephone Company. By the end of the year, the company's name had been changed to Rochester Telephone Company.

The upstart company drummed up about 1500 subscribers for its services and presented a petition to the Rochester City Council for a franchise, which was approved in April 1899. On May 13, 1900, Rochester Telephone inaugurated service to about 1,800 customers. Steady expansion took place in its early years. The company added 1,000 new lines to its switchboard, a second story to its headquarters building, and an entire second switchboard. In addition, Rochester Telephone widened its area of service to include the towns of Charlotte, Fairport, and Pittsford outside city limits. Other counties in western New York were served by company subsidiaries, the Genesee Valley Telephone Company, and the Interlake Telephone Company.

Although customers professed higher satisfaction with the service of the independent Rochester Telephone Company than they had with the Bell system, they were unable to make long-distance calls. In an effort to provide a nationwide network that would allow long-distance calling, the country's alternative telephone companies established the United States Independent Telephone Company in 1905. Two years later, however, after its failure to win entry to the key New York City market, the company failed. Rochester Telephone, which had invested heavily in the enterprise, suffered severe financial damage with its bankruptcy. This, coupled with the high costs of competition with the Bell network, prevented the company from raising any new investment capital for the next four years, and it continued to limp along throughout the 1910s.

The inconvenience of a dual telephone system, which required two sets of phones in each residence or business, and two sets of lines criss-crossing the city, brought growing pressure for consolidation of operations. In 1915, negotiations between Bell and the independents began in New York State. Two years later it was agreed that a new corporation, independent of the Bell organization, would be created to buy and operate the telephone systems of both companies.

Rochester Telephone Corporation (1920-1995) 
Rochester Telephone Corporation (RTC) was for most of the 20th century, the sole phone company serving Rochester and surrounding counties in upstate New York.  Some telephone equipment in the Rochester area still bears the company's name.  Its initial development benefited from the vision of Albrecht Vogt, an early founder of and investor in several Rochester industries, and yielded a successful company that remained independent from the Bell System up to and through the national monopoly's divestiture in 1984.  As a smaller organization with a high-tech city at its core (headquarters of Eastman Kodak and Xerox) RT often led the conservative and intransigent AT&T when it came to features and customer service, delivering, for instance, Touch Tone and caller ID services well before neighborhoods serviced by Bell's regional divisions, like New York Telephone.

The newly constituted company, which had been given the name Rochester Telephone Corporation, had 1,200 employees and assets worth about $6 million. On August 1, 1921, the two halves of the new independent system began operating as one. During the ensuing decade, Rochester Telephone grew dramatically, as the nation's economy boomed in the aftermath of World War I. At the end of 1921, the company had more than 55,000 phones in service. Two years later, after a long controversy, Rochester Telephone won the right to bill its business customers by call, rather than on a flat rate. By 1926, the number of phones had grown to 84,000. Despite these gains, Rochester Telephone worked continuously to convince people that the telephone was not just a luxury or a gimmick—it was a necessity. The company ran ads in newspapers and on the fledgling medium of radio and also enlisted its employees in sales drives. In 1928, the company recorded its largest jump ever in the number of telephones on line and passed the $1 million mark in revenues.

In addition to these gains, Rochester Telephone made a decision in the 1920s that would ultimately result in a setback for the company. In that decade, dial service, which replaced the services of an operator at a switchboard with automatic routing of calls to their destination, was first introduced. After conducting a study, the company decided against undertaking the costly conversion to the new technology. In the 1930s and 1940s, while other telephone companies across the nation were implementing the new, more efficient service, Rochester Telephone, unable to raise the necessary capital for the conversion because of the effects of the Great Depression and the war effort, was forced to continue using archaic equipment.

The 1930s proved to be a difficult decade for Rochester Telephone. Strapped for cash in the midst of the Great Depression, many of the company's customers gave up their phone service, and cancellations exceeded new orders for several years in the early part of the decade. As revenues and earnings fell, Rochester Telephone began to cut its work force in an effort to keep costs down. Remaining employees were put on shortened hours, and their wages were reduced.

The company's darkest hour had passed by 1934, however, and its count of telephones in service and revenues began to creep upward that year. Three years later, the company got further relief when it received its first rate increase from the commission that regulated public utilities in its area. This boon produced over $60,000 in additional annual revenues for Rochester Telephone.

Despite the Depression, Rochester Telephone expanded its facilities during the 1930s, adding new central office space in downtown Rochester and outlying communities. By 1941, Rochester Telephone's revenues had climbed back to their highest point ever. That same year, however, the United States entered World War II, and the economy was converted to a wartime footing. Resources were diverted to the military effort, leaving widespread shortages in the civilian world.

With the gear-up for the war effort, demand for telephone services increased dramatically. The ranks of company employees to meet that demand, however, were thinned by military call-ups. Caught without dial equipment in a situation where new equipment was impossible to procure, Rochester Telephone had difficulty handling the growing volume of calls. Customers were asked to limit the duration of their calls, and tones sounded every three minutes on the line to remind them to get off the phone. On long-distance calls, operators broke in every five minutes to tell callers that others were waiting to use the lines. In addition, Rochester Telephone received many orders for the installation of new equipment which it was unable to fill. By the war's end, the company's waiting list had grown to include 8,000 names.

In 1944 Rochester Telephone sold stock to the public for the first time. Demand for telephone services continued to grow astronomically in the postwar years, and the company found itself unable to keep up with its customers' needs. Rochester Telephone struggled to raise capital to provide for expansion and conversion to more efficient dial switching, and in the meantime, urged its customers not to make nonessential calls. Rochester citizens, relatively tolerant of the company's weaknesses during the war, responded in the postwar period with frustration and criticism. Letters to local papers characterized phone service in the area as 'wretched' and 'outrageous.' Eventually, a state regulatory agency undertook an investigation of Rochester Telephone's operations.

By 1948, Rochester Telephone had a backlog of 12,000 requests for telephone installation. In that same year, the company was finally able to commence a program of conversion to dial telephone service. The costs of this program caused the company to eliminate the dividend on its stock for that year. Partial relief for the company's financial woes came when Rochester Telephone was granted two consecutive rate increases, which provided the company with $1.4 million in extra funds.

Rochester Telephone in the late 1940s faced a severe public relations problem. Open house events at its manual switching centers in 1949 helped to appease the public somewhat, but soon, tempers rose again, as consumers complained about the company's slow and unreliable service.

In the 1950s Rochester Telephone made a number of stock offerings to pay for its long overdue capital improvements. By 1954 the company was finally able to respond promptly to requests for service. Rochester's population and economic base grew rapidly during the decade, particularly in outlying suburban areas, and Rochester Telephone's operations grew along with them. By the end of the decade, the company had 290,000 phones in service, and its revenues and earnings had more than doubled.

This growth in earnings was possible, in part, as a result of rate increases that the company won in 1951 and 1954. In 1958, when Rochester Telephone petitioned the state public utilities commission for yet another rate increase, the anger of some of its customers again spilled over onto the editorial pages of newspapers. Some Rochester Telephone customers in outlying areas were still forced to rely on magneto crank telephones, and in certain suburbs customers were grouped into four- and eight-party lines. The company's preoccupation with the all-important and enormously expensive dial conversion effort had resulted in serious lapses in service in other areas. After the Public Utilities Commission publicly scolded Rochester Telephone for its inept management—calling its incompetent conduct of business 'inexcusable'--the company underwent a major reorganization, and a significant portion of its management was replaced.

The retooled Rochester Telephone entered the 1960s poised to rectify the faults of the past and seek new growth. The company was listed on the New York Stock Exchange for the first time, and it set out to use the capital generated by stock sales to improve service in the rapidly growing suburbs. In 1961, however, this progress was slowed by a nine-week strike of telephone workers that again resulted in a backlog of service calls.

Throughout the rest of the 1960s, the company expanded its infrastructure of cables and switching equipment while adding new lines to keep pace with Rochester's growth. In 1966 Rochester Telephone completed conversion of its entire system to dial switching and established a seven-digit phone number system. By the end of the decade, the company had added 200,000 new phones to its network.

To prepare for further growth, Rochester Telephone initiated employee training programs in the late 1960s. The first sign of that growth came in 1972, when the company made its first acquisition outside the geographical limits of its service area, purchasing the Sylvan Lake Telephone Company. This move was made in response to the slowing rate of economic growth in the company's traditional area of operation. Four years later, a second, much larger purchase was made, when Rochester Telephone acquired the Highland Telephone Company.

In the mid-1970s, Rochester Telephone experienced its first taste of the competition. Around this time, the telephone industry was rocked by a Supreme Court ruling that allowed customers to attach their own phone equipment to company lines. No longer were telephone users required to purchase equipment only from the telephone company itself. Inroads caused by this development, along with other factors, caused a drop in company revenues and earnings during this time. In 1974 the company suffered a strike by telephone workers that lasted 28 weeks, and in the following year, the company also began layoffs, which continued throughout the late 1970s as demand for its services slackened.

In 1978, rebuffed by its regulators in its attempt to form a holding company, Rochester Telephone spent $2 million forming two subsidiaries instead. Rotelcom Business Systems and Rotelcom Consulting Services provided equipment and expertise in the burgeoning telecommunications field. The next year, the business systems unit opened an office in Honolulu to serve hotels there and set up a long-distance service from Hawaii to the continental U.S. known as Call America. One year later, the company added Rotelcom Data, Inc., and a Supply and Set Refurbishment Division, which fixed up used telephones for resale. In their early years, the company's subsidiaries reported strong profits.

In 1983, as the federal government's breakup of the Bell telephone monopoly increased competition in the telecommunications industry dramatically, Rochester Telephone launched its second unregulated venture, founding the RCI Corporation. RCI installed a microwave communications network in New York State and a fiber optic hookup with Chicago. After purchasing an additional fiber optic link with Washington, D.C., the company's operations spanned 12 cities. In the mid-1980s, Rochester Telephone also entered the new radio telephone industry, when it founded Rochester Tel Mobile Communications. By the end of the decade, it managed cellular phone services in six states.

Along with its forays into unregulated industries, Rochester Telephone expanded its holdings in the local telephone exchange business dramatically during the 1980s. In 1984 it added its third New York phone system—in AuSable Valley—and in the ensuing years, the company purchased 34 other telephone operations in 15 states. The largest was located in the suburban Minneapolis, Minnesota area. This geographical expansion was designed to offset the effect of a gradual but unmistakable economic retrenchment in the company's home area, Rochester.

RTC was also nicknamed "Rochester Tel." The company also used a marketing tag line during this time, "Rochester Tel and You—The Perfect Connection".  This reflected the company's commitment to marketing through a partnership with the local community.  The company was one of the first in the nation to offer a caller ID service to its customers.  A trial of this service in the early 1990s was one of the first in the United States.  Customers located in the Perinton area with a telephone number beginning with "223" or "425" had the chance to participate in a trial of this service and other CLASS calling features which were making their debut in New York at that time.

In 1993, then Rochester Telephone Corporation, the company became the first telephone company to open its local telephone lines to competition. Time Warner and AT&T were among the leading competitors; AT&T later withdrew.

Frontier Corporation (1995-1999)
In 1995, the company repositioned itself as a holding company and changed its name to Frontier Corporation. The company separated its local telephone lines in Rochester into a separate operating company also named Rochester Telephone Corporation. This company was eventually renamed in 1997 to Frontier Telephone of Rochester, Inc.

The company operated a wireless subsidiary called Frontier Cellular. It was a joint venture with Bell Atlantic.

Global Crossing North America (2000-2001)
Frontier's investment in fiber long lines proved attractive in the exploding global communications market in the late 1990s when it was acquired in 1999 by Global Crossing, a Bermuda-based communications network enterprise.  In 2000, the holding company adopted its current name, Global Crossing North America, Inc.

In 2001, Global Crossing North America's local exchange assets, including Frontier Telephone of Rochester and Frontier Subsidiary Telco, and ownership of the Frontier name were sold to Citizens Communications Company, which in 2008 renamed itself Frontier Communications.

Leadership

Rochester Telephone/Frontier subsidiaries
The Rochester Telephone, later Frontier Corporation, companies refer to all the local telephone companies owned by Global Crossing North America prior to the companies' sale to Citizens Communications. These companies include:

Frontier Communications - Midland, Inc. (Illinois)
Frontier Communications - Prairie, Inc. (Illinois)
Frontier Communications - Schuyler, Inc. (Illinois)
Frontier Communications - St. Croix LLC (Wisconsin)
Frontier Communications of Alabama LLC
Frontier Communications of Breezewood, LLC (Pennsylvania)
Frontier Communications of Canton, LLC (Pennsylvania; acquired in 1988)
Frontier Communications of DePue, Inc. (Illinois)
Frontier Communications of Fairmount, LLC (Georgia)
Frontier Communications of Georgia LLC
Frontier Communications of Illinois, Inc.
Frontier Communications of Indiana LLC
Frontier Communications of Iowa, LLC
Frontier Communications of Lakeside, Inc. (Illinois)
Frontier Communications of Lakewood, LLC (Pennsylvania)
Frontier Communications of Lamar County LLC (Alabama)
Frontier Communications of Michigan, Inc.
Frontier Communications of Minnesota, Inc.
Frontier Communications of Mississippi LLC
Frontier Communications of Mondovi LLC (Wisconsin)
Frontier Communications of Mt. Pulaski, Inc. (Illinois)
Frontier Communications of Orion, Inc. (Illinois)
Frontier Communications of Oswayo River LLC (Pennsylvania)
Frontier Communications of Pennsylvania, LLC
Frontier Communications of the South LLC
Frontier Communications of Thorntown LLC (Indiana)
Frontier Communications of Viroqua LLC (Wisconsin)
Frontier Communications of Wisconsin LLC
Frontier Telephone of Rochester, Inc. (founded in 1994 - contains the original Rochester, NY telephone exchanges of Rochester Telephone Corporation)

Former subsidiaries
There are a number of former subsidiaries:
 Rochester Telephone - Midway Telephone, Michigan (RTMM) -- sold during the period of 1992 through 1994
 Rochester Telephone - Ontomogan Telephone, Michigan (RTOT) -- sold during the period of 1992 through 1994
 Rochester Telephone - S & A Telephone, Kansas (RTKS) -- sold during the period of 1992 through 1994
 Frontier Communications - Lakeshore, Inc. Wisconsin, (RTLW) -- combined with FC of Wisconsin, Inc. (RTUW) in 1998
 Frontier Communications - Schuyler, Inc., Iowa (RTSO) was sold to Minburn Telecommunications in 1999

References

Bibliography
 Rochester Tel: In Profile, Corporate Information, October 1992.
 Rochester Telephone Company 1991 Annual Report.
 Howe, F. L., Endless Voices: The Story of Rochester Tel, Rochester Telephone Corporation, Rochester, New York, 1992.
 International Directory of Company Histories, Vol. 6. St. James Press, 1992.
 This Great Contrivance - The First Hundred Years of the Telephone in Rochester, Rochester Telephone Corporation, 1979

See also
Frontier Communications
Frontier Telephone of Rochester

American companies established in 1920
Frontier Communications
Companies based in Rochester, New York
Telecommunications companies of the United States
Telecommunications companies established in 1920